The T54 was a series of prototype American tanks of the 1950s with three different turrets, all armed with a 105 mm gun, mounted on the M48 Patton chassis. The T54 had a conventional turret with an autoloader with 3 shells, the T54E1 had an oscillating design with an autoloader, and the T54E2 had a conventional turret with a human loader.

The turret on the T54E1 was similar to that of the T69 in its oscillating design and in that it held a crew of three and a nine-round drum autoloader under the gun. The T54E1 was abandoned in 1956 and in 1957 the entire project was cancelled in favor of the T95 Medium Tank.

Development
In December 1950, the Army Equipment Development Guide recommended that a 105 mm tank gun be pursued. By 6 July 1951, OTCM (Ordnance Technical Committee Minutes) 33842 officially initiated the development project with two new vehicles designated: the 105 mm gun tank T54, and the 105 mm gun tank T54E1.

The T54's 105 mm T140 gun was a lighter version of the 105 mm T5E2, which was the armament of the T29 Heavy Tank. Designed for use with an autoloader, their breeches were inverted and fixed rounds were used. When modified for use with the T54E1 oscillating turret, the gun was designated as the 105 mm gun T140E2.

Variants
T54: armed with a 105 mm T140 in a conventional turret with an autoloader.
T54E1: armed with a 105 mm T140E2 in an oscillating turret with an autoloader.
T54E2: armed with a 105 mm T140E3 in a conventional turret with a human loader.

References

Citations

Bibliography

Cold War tanks of the United States
Medium tanks of the Cold War
Medium tanks of the United States
Abandoned military projects of the United States
Trial and research tanks of the United States